Competitor for  Canada

Lillian Emily Palmer (later Alderson, June 23, 1913 – March 28, 2001) was a Canadian athlete who competed in the 1932 Summer Olympics. She was born and died in Vancouver, British Columbia.

In 1932 she competed in the 4×100 metres where she won the silver medal with her team mates Mildred Fizzell, Mary Frizzel and Hilda Strike who had won the silver medal in the 100 metres. At the 1934 Empire Games she was a member of the Canadian relay team which won the gold medal in the 220-110-220-110 yards competition. In the 220 yards event she finished fourth. At the 1934 Women's World Games in London she was captain of the Canadian team and flag bearer at the opening ceremony, she finished fourth in the 200 metres event.

References

Lillian Palmer's profile at Sports Reference.com

Canadian Olympic committee

1913 births
2001 deaths
Canadian female sprinters
Olympic track and field athletes of Canada
Athletes (track and field) at the 1932 Summer Olympics
Olympic silver medalists for Canada
Athletes (track and field) at the 1934 British Empire Games
Commonwealth Games gold medallists for Canada
Athletes from Vancouver
Commonwealth Games medallists in athletics
Medalists at the 1932 Summer Olympics
Olympic silver medalists in athletics (track and field)
Olympic female sprinters
Medallists at the 1934 British Empire Games